CCR4-NOT transcription complex subunit 7 is a protein that in humans is encoded by the CNOT7 gene. It is a subunit of the CCR4-Not deadenylase complex.

Function 

The protein encoded by this gene binds to an anti-proliferative protein, B-cell translocation protein 1, which negatively regulates cell proliferation. Binding of the two proteins, which is driven by phosphorylation of the anti-proliferative protein, causes signaling events in cell division that lead to changes in cell proliferation associated with cell-cell contact. The protein has both mouse and yeast orthologs. Alternate splicing of this gene results in two transcript variants encoding different isoforms.

Interactions 

CNOT7 has been shown to interact with:
 BTG1, 
 PABPC1,
 TOB1,  and
 TOB2.

References

Further reading

External links